John Michael Formella (born 1986/1987) is an American lawyer serving as the 31st Attorney General of New Hampshire since 2021. He previously served as legal counsel for Governor Chris Sununu.

Early life and career 
Formella was born in Rochester, Minnesota. He has been a resident of New Hampshire since 1999, when his family relocated to New Hampshire from Florida. He is the son of John Formella and Nancy Formella. He attended Florida State University from 2004-2009, where he was a member of Phi Beta Kappa and graduated Magna Cum Laude with a B.A. in English Literature and later an M.S. in Applied American Politics and Policy. Formella later attended George Washington University Law School, where he graduated with honors and was a member of the George Washington University International Law Review. In 2009, Formella served as a legislative intern for Florida State Representative Steve Crisafulli. In 2010, he served as a judicial intern to United States district judge Virginia M. Hernandez Covington of the Middle District of Florida.

After graduating from law school in 2012, Formella began his career in private practice at Pierce Atwood LLP, which was one of the largest law firms in Northern New England. At Pierce Atwood, Formella practiced actively in New Hampshire, Massachusetts and Maine and was a member of the Firm’s Business and Environmental Law practice groups. He left the firm in January of 2017 to accept an appointment as Legal Counsel to incoming New Hampshire Governor Chris Sununu.

Formella served as Governor Chris Sununu’s Legal Counsel from Sununu’s first day in office on January 5, 2017 through April 16, 2021. In that role, he advised the Governor and coordinated with the New Hampshire Department of Justice and Executive Branch officials on all significant legal issues and litigation affecting the State. In addition, he worked with the Sununu administration to address numerous and significant challenges, including the negotiation of a revised seven year MET/DSH settlement agreement that brought stability to New Hampshire’s healthcare system, the establishment of a new Doorway Program that greatly enhanced the State’s response to the Opioid Crisis, criminal justice reform initiatives that secured the support of law enforcement and community stakeholders, and the multi-faceted efforts that the State of New Hampshire undertook to combat the Covid-19 pandemic.

New Hampshire Attorney General 
On March 3, 2021, Governor Chris Sununu nominated Formella to succeed Gordon J. MacDonald as New Hampshire Attorney General. Formella was confirmed by the Executive Council of New Hampshire in a 4-1 party line vote on March 24, 2021 and sworn into office on April 22, 2021.

As Attorney General, Formella serves as the New Hampshire’s Chief Law Enforcement Officer, Chief Prosecutor, and Chief Legal Officer. 

Formella has continued the efforts of past New Hampshire Attorneys General to pursue companies responsible for fueling the opioid epidemic. On September 28, 2021, Formella announced that New Hampshire would join a $21 billion settlement with opioid distributors McKesson Corporation, Cardinal Health and Amerisource Bergen. Under the settlement, New Hampshire will receive approximately $115 million over 18 years.

Since taking office, Formella has joined in several efforts to push back against actions by President Joe Biden’s administration. New Hampshire is part of a coalition of 13 states that are suing the Biden Administration over a provision in the American Rescue Plan Act that bars states from using relief money to offset tax cuts.  In August of 2021, Formella partnered with 19 other attorneys general to submit comments opposing proposed rules from The Bureau of Alcohol, Tobacco, Firearms and Explosives (ATF) that would increase regulation of firearms kits.  And in September of 2021, Formella joined with 23 other Republican Attorneys General in a letter to President Joe Biden threatening legal action against the President’s planned requirement that all businesses with over 100 employees institute a mandatory vaccination or testing requirement.

References

1980s births
Living people
Florida State University alumni
George Washington University Law School alumni
New Hampshire Attorneys General
New Hampshire Republicans
Politicians from Rochester, Minnesota
Year of birth missing (living people)